Marz Dasht is a village in Kateh Sar-e Khomam Rural District, Khomam District, Rasht County, Gilan Province, Iran. At the 2006 census, its population was 1,149, with 327 families.

References 

Populated places in Rasht County